Pseudomonas gelidicola is a Gram-negative marine bacteria. The type strain is IAM 1127.

References

Pseudomonadales
Bacteria described in 1951